HMS Portland is a Type 23 frigate of the British Royal Navy. She is the eighth ship to bear the name and is the fifteenth and penultimate ship of the 'Duke' class of frigates, and is named for the currently extinct title of the Dukedom of Portland, and more particularly for the third Duke, who was Prime Minister.

Operational history

2000–2010
The ship was accepted into service by the Royal Navy on 15 December 2000 and was commissioned on 3 May the following year. Present at the commissioning ceremony was Portlands sponsor Lady Brigstocke, wife of Admiral Sir John Brigstocke, a former Second Sea Lord; Lady Brigstocke launched the ship in 1999.

Portland's Lynx helicopter (XZ724) was lost at sea on 8 December 2004. The aircraft had been launched following the potential sighting of a man overboard. All four crew were killed, including Lieutenant David Cole RN, the flight commander, who had embarked to augment the duty crew.

Portland assisted in the search for men lost from a capsized yacht on 3 February 2007.

She was deployed to the Caribbean for seven months in 2007, intercepting 3.5 tonnes of cocaine in cooperation with a United States Coast Guard Law Enforcement Detachment (LEDET) and conducting disaster relief in Belize following Hurricane Dean.

In June 2009 while taking part in anti-piracy operations off the Horn of Africa, Portland intercepted ten alleged pirates but because the suspects were not caught in the immediate act of piracy, the vessel was unable legally to detain them.

In late April 2010, Portland relieved  on the Atlantic Patrol Task (South).

2011–present

June 2011 saw Portland conducting night Naval Gunnery practice off Gibraltar in the Mediterranean. Towards the end of the month she sailed to Edinburgh to take part in Armed Forces Day. She was the first major warship in the Royal Navy to be commanded by a woman: Commander Sarah West assumed command of HMS Portland on 21 May 2012, but was relieved of command in July 2014 following an alleged affair with one of the ship's officers.

Portland spent 2012 at Rosyth in a 50-week refit that saw her upgraded with Sonar 2087, new IT systems, Sea Wolf mid-life overhaul, gun replacements, galley refurbishment and accommodation improvements. She left Rosyth on 14 December 2012 for three months of sea trials.

In August 2013, she was announced as the Fleet Ready Escort for the next two months. She participated in Exercise Joint Warrior 2013.

On 2 August 2014, she completed the 7-month task of the Atlantic Patrol ship.

On 20 June 2016, Portland departed Devonport for a nine-month patrol covering the Middle East and the South Atlantic Ocean. Portland was the last Royal Navy ship to carry Radar 996 and was the last ship to conduct a Replenishment at Sea with  prior to the latter ship's decommissioning

In 2018, Portland began a Life Extension (LIFEX) refit at Babcock's Frigate Support Centre in Devonport. Her refit included the installation of the Sea Ceptor surface-to-air missile system, 997 surveillance radar, 1084 navigational radar and the 2150 hull-mounted sonar. She returned to sea in March 2021.

Affiliations
Irish Guards
The Royal Wessex Yeomanry
Worshipful Company of Scriveners
 Worshipful Company of Masons
Dorset Chamber of Commerce
Earl of Portland
Cambridge URNU

References

External links

 

 

Frigates of the United Kingdom
Ships built on the River Clyde
1999 ships
Type 23 frigates of the Royal Navy